"Almost Got 'Im" is the thirty-fifth episode of the Warner Bros. television program Batman: The Animated Series, which first aired on November 10, 1992, and was written by Paul Dini and directed by Eric Radomski. This episode features seven villains of Batman's rogues gallery, with five of them telling their respective stories of the times they each came closest to killing the Dark Knight (via a frame story), and the ending leading to a singular plot twist.

Plot
While hiding out from the police, five of Gotham's notorious criminals—the Joker, the Penguin, Two-Face, Poison Ivy, and Killer Croc—gather at the criminals-only Stacked Deck Club. While passing the time with a game of cards, their conversation focuses on their mutual foe, Batman. In the conversation, Joker mentions Batman's recent victory over the Mad Hatter, Two-Face expresses doubt that he is one person, Croc theorizes he is a robot, and Penguin correctly theorizes that he suffered some crime-related trauma in the past that made him who he is. Eventually the subject leads each to an argument over who came the closest to killing Batman, and at the Joker's behest each criminal details their own story about how they "almost got 'im".

Ivy recounts how she had unleashed poisonous gas on Halloween, through thousands of pumpkins, only for Batman to thwart her plans by overcoming a trap she had created for him when he began investigating the sudden ill effects that Gotham's inhabitants suffered from. At first Poison Ivy managed to weaken Batman with the gas, and prepared to unmask him. However, Batman programs the Batmobile to chase her, and he used the opportunity to get out a mask from the Batmobile.

Two-Face recounts how he had staged a robbery at a mint for $2 million in two dollar bills and had managed to take away Batman's utility belt and strap him onto a giant penny that he planned to catapult. However, Two-Face realized that Batman had stolen his coin and used it to break free, before apprehending him and his gang.

Croc attempts to detail how he nearly defeated Batman with a "big rock" during a battle in a quarry; unlike the others, none of the villains opt to listen to his story or learn how it went wrong.

Penguin recalls how he had turned a zoo aviary into a home for dangerous birds as part of a plot to kill Batman with several poison-beaked hummingbirds, only for the Dark Knight to soak them in water with the aviary's sprinkler, survive an attack by a cassowary, and inject himself with an antidote; Penguin was forced to flee as a direct result.

With his cohorts having told their stories, Joker recalls how he had been close to killing Batman the night before. After capturing the Dark Knight, Joker commandeered the set of a late-night talk show, holding the studio audience hostage. With help from his gang and Harley Quinn, Joker intended to kill his nemesis on live television through a "laugh-powered electric chair" and pumping the studio with laughing gas. Before Batman was subjected to a lethal dose of electricity, Catwoman broke into the studio, distracting Joker in the ensuing fight long enough for the Dark Knight to escape. Before she can keep Joker from fleeing the studio, Harley managed to knock Catwoman unconscious from behind, with Joker instructing that she be hidden away.

With his story over, Croc questions Joker on what he did with Catwoman, to which he answers that she was taken to a cat food factory to be dealt with once he was finished at the club. To Joker's surprise, Croc attacks him, revealing himself to be Batman in disguise. As the other villains prepare to deal with him, Batman reveals that they were lured there as part of a sting operation organised by Gotham police, who were present in the club, in an attempt to find out Catwoman's whereabouts from Joker. While Commissioner Gordon and Detective Bullock arrest the group, Batman heads out to the factory.

At the cat food cannery, Batman finds Harley with Catwoman. Catwoman is tied down to an assembly line, set to be ground up and mixed with supplies of cat food. Harley attempts to escape by turning on the conveyor belt, forcing Batman to choose between apprehending her and saving Catwoman. Harley bolts while Catwoman struggles fruitlessly against her bonds. Batman, finding the machine's power switch, is able to capture Harley and rescue Catwoman. As Harley is arrested, Catwoman thanks Batman for the rescue, to which he states he owed her one for saving him from Joker's scheme. As Catwoman discusses their relationship and makes a pass on him, Batman pulls off his trademark disappearing act, leaving her to smile and mutter to herself "Hmm. Almost got 'im."

Voice cast

Reception

The episode is widely regarded as among the series' best, and is ranked by fans on IMDB at 9.2. Ranking it the No. 2 best episodes of the series, IGN writes, "It’s one of Paul Dini’s cleverest episodes, and typifies the distilled iconography that the show did so well." Sandra Dozier calls the episode "charming" and praises it for showing "the origin story for the Bat Cave's giant penny."

D.N. Ace did a tribute to this in episode 39 called "Almost Aced 'Em".

DVD release
The episode features a commentary on the DVD release.

References

External links 
 

1992 American television episodes
Batman: The Animated Series episodes
Television episodes written by Paul Dini